Mont Orgueil (French for 'Mount Pride') is a castle in Jersey that overlooks the harbour of Gorey; a port on the east coast of the Island. It is known as Gorey Castle by English-speakers, and lé Vièr Châté (the Old Castle) by Jèrriais-speakers. The castle was first referred to as 'Mont Orgeuil' in an ordinance survey made in 1462, when the castle was under French occupation in the late Middle Ages. The castle was the seat of royal authority on Jersey throughout the medieval period and served as the main fortress on the Island until the construction of Elizabeth Castle in 1594. It is classified as a Grade I listed building .

Prehistory
The site had been fortified during the Iron Age, as excavations in the 1970s showed, the existence of an earth rampart at the top of the granite rock, that the castle now rests on. Other materials were also found at the site, such as arrowheads and pottery, which actually date from the Neolithic period (4000–2500 BC). This suggests that the site was inhabited before the erection of the earthwork rampart. These promontory forts were found all across the north of Jersey, as they utilised the natural defences of the high cliffs which can be found on that part of the Island, to offer a refuge for the Island's inhabitants from raiders.

Middle Ages
Jersey became part of the Duchy of Normandy in 933 when it was conquered by the Normans. The Islands were then joined to the Kingdom of England after the Duke of Normandy, William the Conqueror won the Battle of Hastings in 1066. The construction of the castle was undertaken following the conquest of the Duchy of Normandy in 1204 by Philip II of France from John, King of England. The castle was first mentioned in 1212.

The castle was the primary defence of Jersey for over 400 years and withstood a number of French assaults on the castle, the most notable of which was in 1373 when the Constable of France, Bertrand du Guesclin, attacked the castle with 2,000 men in July of that year. Despite breaching the outer walls of the Castle, the French could not breach the inner walls of Mont Orgueil, as these actually rested upon a solid mass of granite rock.

The castle was eventually taken by the French later on, though it was effectively handed over to them in 1461 rather than taken by force of arms. This transfer of the castle to the French was supposedly the result of a plot hatched by Margaret of Anjou, who was the French-born wife of Henry VI of England, and the French King, Louis XI. The transfer of the castle was predicated on French support of money, arms, and mercenaries for the Lancastrian cause during the Wars of the Roses. After seven years of occupation, the castle was retaken by a combined English-Jerseyman force led by the Yorkish admiral, Richard Harliston in 1468.

1500s
Mont Orgueil went through an intense period of renovation in the mid-1500s, which was largely a result of the increasing use of cannon in European warfare. The castle was particularly susceptible to cannon fire coming from the hill west of the castle, known as Mont Saint Nicolas. Mont Orgueil was updated with platforms for artillery constructed in 1548 and 1549 under the direction of Henry Cornish, Lieutenant of the Earl of Hertford in Jersey. Cornish complained that earlier repairs to the donjon by Robert Raymont had left it so weak it was vulnerable to musket shot; "lyke a nadyl eye scarse abyll to byde a hagboshe." In 1543 he had asked for a "saker" cannon that would cover the sands between "Grovyll" and the castle, where the French had landed in the past.

Other later renovations included the extension of the medieval Keep into a D-shaped bastion, which was suitably strengthened against artillery fire, and a large L-shaped battery known as the Grand Battery, which also faced to the west, which were completed in 1551 and circa-1560 respectively. These extensions were largely in vain, however, and Mont Orgueil was to be superseded by Elizabeth Castle off Saint Helier, the construction of which commenced at the end of the 16th century. Walter Raleigh, Governor of Jersey in 1600, rejected a plan to demolish the old castle to recycle the stone for the new fortifications with the words: "'twere pity to cast it down".

1600s
The 'old castle' continued to be used as the island's only prison until the construction of a prison in St. Helier at the end of the 17th century. The English Government found it convenient to send troublesome agitators such as William Prynne and John Lilburne to Mont Orgueil, as Jersey law was distinct from English Common Law and lacked a prohibition against arbitrary detention (such as the mainland's Habeas Corpus). The regicides Thomas Waite, Henry Smith, James Temple, Hardress Waller, and Gilbert Millington were also transferred to Mont Orgueil in 1661.

During the English Civil War, the then Lieutenant-Governor and Bailiff of the island, Sir Philippe de Carteret held Elizabeth Castle for the Royalists, leaving his wife Anne de Carteret, and their son Philippe de Carteret to occupy Mont Orgueil. It was from Mont Orgueil that the Royalists under Sir George Carteret retook the island from the Parliamentarian forces in November 1643. The Dean of Jersey, David Bandinel, and his son, Jacques Bandinel, were imprisoned at the castle as they had been leading supporters of the anti-Royalist cause. In February 1645, the two men attempted an escape from the castle, whereby they abseiled out of a window on the seaward side of Mont Orgueil. The makeshift rope did not hold and they both fell to their deaths on the rocks below.

In December 1651, the Island was invaded by the New Model Army, commanded by Colonel James Heane. Colonel Heane landed with 3,000 men (comprising his own regiment), six companies of Sir Hardress Waller's foot and two troops of horse. They defeated the Jersey militia during an engagement on the west of the Island at St. Ouen's Bay. Faced with the prospect of a siege by a competent military force,  the fortress of Mont Orgueil surrendered with generous terms allowing those inside to go to Elizabeth Castle.

A report for the States of Jersey in 1691 declared that the barracks accommodation was so dilapidated that it was impossible to quarter troops there. Two years later, the castle was stated to be in a ruinous condition and subsequently was abandoned as a prison, because Elizabeth Castle had been built and the castle was neglected and not needed any more.

Later Years
Repairs were carried out 1730–1734 and for the rest of the century, parts of the castle were adapted for garrison accommodation. In 1770 the rooms inside the Keep were occupied by officers and soldiers from the Island's garrison. The old Catholic chapel, known as St. Mary's chapel, was converted into a barrack room for 60 men with bedsteads and other fitments installed in the chapel.

The castle was given over to a British naval officer, Philippe d'Auvergne, who was tasked with heading a spy network called 'La Correspondance', which was designed to destabilise the French Revolutionary government in Brittany and Normandy. One such scheme was the importation of forged French Assignat notes into the country, which had the effect of causing hyperinflation, which ravaged the French economy until 1802. In 1800, the Corbelled Tower was fitted out for use by d'Auvergne as his private headquarters.

Over the course of the 19th century, detachments of troops were housed in the castle.

Until the second half of the 19th century, the castle was open to the public on one day a year, Easter Monday, and crowds used to flock from all over the island. This is believed to be a survival of the pre-Reformation custom of visiting St. George's Chapel inside the castle on St. George's Day.

The castle continued to decay, and due to its generally ruinous state it was handed over to the people of Jersey by the Crown on 28 June 1907. Mont Orgueil has been managed as a museum site since 1929.

During the Second World War German occupation (1940–1945), the castle was occupied by the Germans. Initially a small picket was installed on the top of the Keep and the Gardien of the castle, Captain Joe Dorey, was allowed to stay in his cottage in the Lower Ward. This soon changed when Adolf Hitler ordered that Channel Islands undergo an intensive building programme, aimed at turning the Islands into "an impregnable fortress". In 1941, more troops were billeted inside the castle and the Gardien and his family were evicted. This included elements of the Army Coastal Artillery Regiment 1265, who manned the three observation towers at the top of the Keep, and a small detachment of German Infantry. In July 1944, a makeshift bunker was constructed within the castle; which served as the headquarters for the 1st Battalion of the Army Coastal Artillery.

Royal visits 

In 1846, the castle was visited by Queen Victoria and Prince Albert. The castle has also hosted subsequent royal ceremonies to welcome George V in 1921 and Elizabeth II; inscriptions mark the occasions.

Present day
The heritage site has been managed by the Jersey Heritage Trust since 1994. In the early 21st century, the Trust planned to build a Tudor hall within the castle's keep. Around the same time, a £3 million grant was given to fund restoration work. In 2004, a commemorative Jersey pound note was put into circulation depicting Mont Orgueil. The castle is depicted on the 2010 issue Jersey 50-pound note. On 2 April 2006, after a long building programme, the castle was reopened to the public by the Lieutenant-Governor of Jersey. Restoration work has opened up previously inaccessible areas of the castle to the public. Newly built additions in modern style have enclosed sections of the castle and made them weatherproof, parts of the structure have been reinterpreted, and artistic interventions in the grounds and structure of the castle have provided attractions for visitors.

See also

Fort Regent
Elizabeth Castle

References

 Customs, Ceremonies & Traditions of the Channel Islands, Lemprière, London 1976,

External links

Mont Orgueil Castle Homepage
Bibliography of sources related to Mont Orgueil Castle
Time Team's Mont Orguiel Dig Report

Buildings and structures completed in 1450
Castles in Jersey
Museums in Jersey
Buildings and structures in Saint Martin, Jersey
Archaeological sites in Jersey
Prisons in Jersey
German occupation of Jersey during World War II
World War II sites in the Channel Islands
Burial sites of the Seymour family